The Portland Interscholastic League (PIL) is a high school athletic conference in Portland, Oregon that is a member of the Oregon School Activities Association (OSAA). It consists of high schools in the Portland Public Schools district. Competition among member schools dates back to at least 1900.

Member schools
The conference has nine schools in the OSAA 6A classification. The teams in the conference had competed in as many as three classifications since 2006, but were unified in the 6A classification for the 2014–2015 season.

Defunct schools
Adams High School (closed 1981)
Jackson High School (closed 1981)
James John High School (closed 1921)
Marshall High School (closed 2011)
Washington-Monroe High School (closed 1981)

Hall of Fame
The PIL Hall of Fame Association was established in 1981 to honor athletes, coaches, and administrators who have been a part of the PIL.

PIL Boys Basketball State Champions
PIL Teams have competed in the OSAA State Basketball Championship since it was first held in 1919.

References

External links
PIL website
PIL Hall of Fame website

High school sports in Oregon
High school sports conferences and leagues in the United States
Portland Public Schools (Oregon)